Frank Marth (July 29, 1922 – January 12, 2014) was an American film and television actor. He may be best known as a cast-member of Cavalcade of Stars (1949; 1950–1957), especially segments of The Honeymooners, which later became a television series (1955–56).

Early years
Marth was born in the Washington Heights neighborhood of Manhattan to Mr. And Mrs. Frank Marth, Sr. He attended public schools graduating from Commerce High School. He initially worked in building construction, but after World War II he attended the Feagin School of Dramatic Art with plans to work in radio.

Career
Early in his career, Marth worked in radio, including being announcer, commentator, and disc jockey on WOV in New York City and WWDX-FM and WPAT in New Jersey.

On stage, Marth acted in productions of local and regional theaters, including the Greenwood Playhouse in Maine and the Willimantic Playhouse in Connecticut.

Marth's big screen credits included roles in films such as Madame X (1966), Madigan (1968), Pendulum (1969), The Lost Man (1969), Marooned (1969) and Telefon (1977).

On television, Marth appeared in two episodes of Perry Mason, five episodes of The Big Valley, one episode of The Wild, Wild West and Mannix, five episodes of Hogan's Heroes, three episodes of Barnaby Jones, two episodes of Mission: Impossible, as well as on Hawaii Five-O, The Fugitive, Cannon,  The Invaders, The F.B.I., The Streets of San Francisco, The Six Million Dollar Man, The New Adventures of Wonder Woman, Dallas and M*A*S*H. In 1970 Marth appeared as Rawlings in the western TV series The Virginian in the episode titled "The Gift." In 1976, he appeared in an episode of Sara and played the Commanding Officer of Ben Murphy's leading officer in the TV mini series version of The Dirty Dozen. He also played Ben Fraser, Jr. in the NBC drama From These Roots (1958-1961) and was a regular on Jackie Gleason and His American Scene Magazine and The Jackie Gleason Show.

Tall and fair-haired, Marth, often in tandem with the short, dark-haired George O. Petrie, played various recurring and one-time roles on The Honeymooners, i.e. as one of the brutal hoods who hold the Kramdens and Ed Norton hostage after Ralph witnesses a bank robbery; as Harvey Walstatter, who hires Alice Kramden to babysit his son, Harvey, Jr.; and as the inquiring news photographer who lands Ralph Kramden in hot water after he quotes Kramden declaring that he is "head of the household".

Death
Marth died of congestive heart failure and Alzheimer's disease on January 12, 2014, in Rancho Mirage, California, aged 91.

Filmography (partial)

Television (partial)
1955-1957 The Honeymooners

 1964 Combat! 
Season 3, Episode 7 "Operation Fly Trap" as a German Captain

 1964 My Favorite Martian
Season 2, Episode 8 "The Great Brain Robbery" as Capt. Edward Prescott

 1965 Hogan's Heroes
Season 1, Episode 13 "Hogan's Hofbrau" as Capt. Milheiser

 1966 Combat!
Season 4, Episode 30 "Run, Sheep, Run" as Lt. Vogler

 1970 The Virginian
Season 8, Episode 24 "The Gift" as Emmett Rawlings

 1974-1976 Cannon
Season 4, Episode 1 "Kelly's Song" as Captain Royce
Season 5, Episode 23 "Point After Death" as Eliott Strickland

 1977 Wonder Woman
Season 2, Episode 5 "Knockout" as Tall Man

 1979 Battlestar Galactica
Episode 20 "Greetings from Earth"

 1983-1986 The A-Team
Season 3, Episode 18 "Road Games" as Jim Sullivan

References

External links

1922 births
2014 deaths
American male film actors
American male television actors
Male actors from New York City
Deaths from Alzheimer's disease
Deaths from dementia in California
Deaths from congestive heart failure
20th-century American male actors